Robert Wilson Pursell (28 September 1919 – August 2005) was a Scottish footballer who played as a full-back for Wolverhampton Wanderers, Port Vale, Winsford United, and Northwich Victoria. He was the son of Peter Pursell and nephew to Bob Pursell, who were also defenders who played for Port Vale.

Career
Pursell played for Northwood B.S.C., Chesterton and Wolverhampton Wanderers, before joining Port Vale on trial from Chesterton in November 1939 and signing professional forms the next month. During the war his career was put on hold, and he guested for Boulton Paul Aircraft Ltd. and the Bristol Aeroplane Company Ltd. As Vale began playing football again in August 1944 he returned to The Old Recreation Ground, but was only utilized regularly from September 1945. He made 32 Third Division South and five FA Cup appearances in the 1946–47 season. However, he played just seven games in the 1947–48 season, and manager Gordon Hodgson allowed him a transfer to Winsford United in July 1949. Later he played for Northwich Victoria and Michelin.

Career statistics
Source:

References

1919 births
2005 deaths
Footballers from Glasgow
Scottish footballers
Association football defenders
Wolverhampton Wanderers F.C. players
Port Vale F.C. players
Winsford United F.C. players
Northwich Victoria F.C. players
English Football League players
Anglo-Scots